Sylvia Dockerill (born 17 September 1951) is a Canadian former breaststroke swimmer. She competed in two events at the 1972 Summer Olympics.

References

External links
 

1951 births
Living people
Canadian female breaststroke swimmers
Olympic swimmers of Canada
Swimmers at the 1972 Summer Olympics
Swimmers from Vancouver
Pan American Games gold medalists for Canada
Pan American Games medalists in swimming
Swimmers at the 1971 Pan American Games
Commonwealth Games medallists in swimming
Commonwealth Games bronze medallists for Canada
Medalists at the 1971 Pan American Games
Swimmers at the 1970 British Commonwealth Games
20th-century Canadian women
21st-century Canadian women
Medallists at the 1970 British Commonwealth Games